Sérgio Sztancsa (born 27 May 1954) is a Brazilian rower. He competed in the men's double sculls event at the 1976 Summer Olympics.

References

1954 births
Living people
Brazilian male rowers
Olympic rowers of Brazil
Rowers at the 1976 Summer Olympics
Place of birth missing (living people)